The Susquehanna River is in the U.S. States of Maryland, Pennsylvania and New York. As of 2000, the Susquehanna drainage basin population was 3,968,635. By area, the Susquehanna basin accounts for 45% of Pennsylvania, 11% of New York, and 3% of Maryland . The drainage basin is divided into six subbasins by the Susquehanna River Basin Commission. These are:

Lower Susquehanna (green on the map at right)
Juniata River (pink)
West Branch Susquehanna River (orange)
Middle Susquehanna (purple)
Chemung River (Yellow)
Upper Susqehanna River (brown)

Lower Susquehanna River

Maryland Counties

Baltimore County
Carroll County
Cecil County
Harford County

Pennsylvania Counties
Adams County
Berks County
Centre County
Chester County
Columbia County
Cumberland County
Dauphin County
Franklin County
Juniata County
Lancaster County
Lebanon County
Mifflin County
Northumberland County
Perry County
Schuylkill County
Snyder County
Union County
York County

Juniata River

Pennsylvania Counties
Bedford County
Blair County
Cambria County
Centre County
Dauphin County
Franklin County
Fulton County
Huntingdon County
Franklin County
Fulton County
Juniata County
Mifflin County
Perry County
Somerset County
Snyder County

West Branch Susquehanna River
 
Pennsylvania Counties
Blair County
Bradford County 
Cambria County 
Cameron County 
Centre County 
Clearfield County 
Clinton County 
Columbia County 
Elk County 
Indiana County
Jefferson County
Lycoming County 
McKean County 
Montour County 
Northumberland County
Potter County 
Sullivan County 
Tioga County 
Union County 
Wyoming County

Middle Susquehanna River

Pennsylvania Counties
Bradford County
Carbon County
Columbia County
Lackawanna County
Luzerne County
Lycoming County
Montour County
Northumberland County
Schuylkill County
Sullivan County
Susquehanna County
Tioga County
Wayne County
Wyoming County

Chemung River

Pennsylvania Counties
Bradford County
Potter County
Tioga County

New York Counties
Allegany County
Chemung County
Livingston County
Ontario County
Schuyler County
Stueben County
Tioga County
Yates County

Upper Susquehanna River

Pennsylvania Counties
Bradford County
Susquehanna County
Wayne County

New York Counties
Broome County
Chemung County
Chenango County
Cortland County
Delaware County
Herkimer County
Madison County
Oneida County
Onondaga County
Otsego County
Schoharie County
Schuyler County
Tioga County
Tompkins County

References

Counties